The Fire Station No. 6 in Sacramento, California, at 3414 4th Ave., was built in 1915.  It was listed on the National Register of Historic Places in 1991.

It was designed by Sacramento civil engineer and utility facility designer Albert Givan, and has elements of Prairie School style.

It operated as a fire station until 1979.

See also 
 Firehouse No. 3 (Sacramento, California)
 National Register of Historic Places listings in Sacramento County, California

References

Fire stations on the National Register of Historic Places in California
National Register of Historic Places in Sacramento, California
Prairie School architecture
Fire stations completed in 1915
1915 establishments in California